Ruapekapeka, a pā  southeast of Kawakawa in the Northland Region of New Zealand, is one of the largest and most complex pā in New Zealand; Ngāpuhi designed it specifically to counter the cannon of British forces.
The earthworks can still be seen.

Ruapekapeka was the site of the last battle in the Flagstaff War of 1845-1846, fought between Colonial forces and the Ngāpuhi led by Hone Heke and Te Ruki Kawiti. This was the first major armed conflict between the Colonial government and the Māori.

Design of Ruapekapeka Pā
This war pā was named Ruapekapeka (bats' nests) because the pihareinga, or dugouts with narrow circular entrances at top, which gave access to shelters that protected the warriors from cannon fire. These ruas or caves looked like a calabash buried underground, the narrow end uppermost and could accommodate 15 to 20 warriors.

Te Ruki Kawiti and his allies, including Mataroria and Motiti, designed Ruapekapeka Pā as a further development of what is now called the "gunfighter pā" design that was used at the Battle of Ōhaeawai. It was constructed during 1845, in a good defensive position, in an area of no strategic value, well away from non-combatants, as a challenge to British rule. Ruapekapeka Pā improved on the plan of the pā at Ōhaeawai, the site of a battle in the Flagstaff War.

Since the introduction of muskets the Māori had learnt to cover the outside of the palisades with layers of flax (Phormium tenax) leaves, making them effectively bulletproof as the velocity of musket balls was dissipated by the flax leaves. On some of the sides of the pā there were three rows of palisades and on other side there were two rows of palisades. There were passages between the front and back trenches (parepare), so that warriors could move forward to fire and return to shelter to reload. On the high ground an observation tower was erected.

Battle of Ruapekapeka Pā

When the new British Governor, Sir George Grey, failed to end the Flagstaff War by negotiation, he assembled a British force of 1,168 men in the Bay of Islands to deal with Hone Heke and Te Ruki Kawiti.

The ordnance used in the battle were three naval 32-pounders, one 18-pounder, two 12-pounder howitzers, one 6-pounder brass gun, four 5½" brass Mann mortars, and two Congreve rocket-tubes. It took two weeks to bring the heavy guns into range of the pā, they started the cannon bombardment on 27 December 1845. The directing officers were Lieutenant Bland (HMS Racehorse) and Lieutenant Leeds (HEICS Elphinstone); Lieutenant Egerton (HMS North Star) was in charge of firing the rocket-tubes. Bombardment and an incomplete siege commenced on 27 December 1845 (the British lacking the manpower to completely surround the pā). Several weeks of siege punctuated by skirmishing followed.The guns were fired with accuracy throughout the siege causing considerable damage to the palisades, although those inside the pā were safe in the underground shelters.

The colonial forces consisted of the 58th Regiment (led by Lieut.-Colonel Wynward), the 99th Regiment (led by Captain Reed) and 42 volunteers from Auckland (led by Captain Atkyns). Tāmati Wāka Nene, Eruera Maihi Patuone, Tawhai, Repa, and Nopera Pana-kareao led around 450 warriors in support of the colonial forces. The soldiers were supported by the Royal Marines (under Captain Langford) and sailors from HMS Castor,  HMS Racehorse, HMS North Star, HMS Calliope, and the 18-gun sloop HEICS Elphinstone of the Honourable East India Company.

The Māori had a deck-cannon (designed for use on a ship) and a field gun. A marine-gunner scored a direct hit on the deck-cannon after three shots, rendering it useless. In any event the Māori had limited supplies of gunpowder so that the possession of these guns did not assist the Māori in the defence of Ruapekapeka. The Māori were armed with double-barrel muzzle-loading muskets (Tupara), flintlock muskets (Ngutuparera, so called because the hammer holding the flint looked like a duck's beak) as well as some pistols.

Several weeks of siege punctuated by skirmishing followed, until early on the morning of Sunday 11 January 1846

The siege continued for some two weeks, punctuated by skirmishing from the pā to keep everyone alert. Then, early in the morning of Sunday, 11 January 1846, William Walker Turau, the brother of Eruera Maihi Patuone, discovered that the pā appeared to have been abandoned, although Te Ruki Kawiti and a few of his warriors remained behind and appeared to have been caught unaware by the British assault. A small group of British troops pushed over the palisade and entered the pā, finding it almost empty. They were reinforced, while Māori tried to re-enter the pā from the back. After a four-hour gun fight the remaining Māori withdrew, abandoning the pā. Lieutenant Colonel Despard claimed the outcome as a "brilliant success". The Royal Marines and sailors from HMS Hazard, HMS North Star and HMS Calliope saw action in the battle. The "Official Despatches" released for publication on 17 January 1846 stated that casualties in the British forces were 3 soldiers killed and 11 wounded; 2 marines killed and 3 wounded; 7 seamen killed and 12 wounded; and 2 pioneers killed and 1 wounded. However other published sources give different casualty figures: Reverend Richard Davis noted in his diary of 14 January 1846, that 12 were killed and 30 wounded; Māori casualties are unknown, (Heke and Kawiti later said they had lost around 60 dead during the whole of the campaign).

 Later examination of the pā showed that it had been very well designed and very strongly built. In different circumstances it could have withstood a long and costly siege. Lieutenant Henry Colin Balneavis, 58th Regiment, who took part in the siege, commented in his journal (dated 11 January):

The reason why the defenders appeared to have abandoned but then re-entered the pā is the subject of continuing debate. It was later suggested that most of the Māori had been at church (many of them were devout Christians). Knowing that their opponents, the British, were also Christians they had not expected an attack on a Sunday. Reverend Richard Davis noted in his diary of 14 January 1846:

However, later commentators have cast doubt on this explanation of the events of Sunday 11 January, as fighting had continued on a Sunday at the Battle of Ōhaeawai in July 1845. Yet other later commentators suggested that Heke deliberately abandoned the pā to lay a trap in the surrounding bush, as this would provide cover and give Heke a considerable advantage. In this scenario, Heke's ambush succeeded only partially, as Kawiti's men, fearing their chief had fallen, returned towards the pā and the British forces engaged in battle with the Māori rebels immediately behind the pā.

Aftermath of the battle of Ruapekapeka
It was Māori custom that the place of a battle where blood was spilt became tapu so that the Ngāpuhi left Ruapekapeka Pā.

After the battle of Ruapekapeka Kawiti expressed the will to continue to fight, however Kawiti and Heke made it known that they would end the rebellion if the Colonial forces would leave the Ngāpuhi land.

Tāmati Wāka Nene acted as an intermediary in the negotiations with Governor Grey. At this time Governor Grey faced new threats of rebellion in the south and would have had logistical difficulties in a lengthy campaign against Heke and Kawiti; although Governor Grey may have underestimated the difficulties the essentially part-time Māori force would experience in continuing to fight against the Colonial forces. Governor Grey accepted Tāmati Wāka Nene's argument that clemency was the best way to ensure peace in the North. Heke and Kawiti were pardoned and no land was confiscated.

Lieutenant Henry Balneavis, 58th Regiment, created a model of Ruapekapeka pā as a part of the New Zealand showcase at the Great Exhibition in London, in 1851.

References

External links
Department of Conservation – Ruapekapeka Pa
 
 
 

Far North District
Forts in New Zealand
Flagstaff War
Tourist attractions in the Northland Region
Pre-colonial architecture in New Zealand